Páramo del Sil is a municipality of Spain, in the region of El Bierzo, province of León, autonomous region of Castilla y León.

The municipality is situated on the banks of the river Sil in the most northern part of El Bierzo.

Location of Páramo del Sil in Google Maps

Municipalities in the Province of León